Wadlow is an English surname. Notable people with the surname include:

 Jeff Wadlow (born 1976), American film director, screenwriter, and producer
 Mark Wadlow (born 1962), English screenwriter
 Robert Wadlow (1918–1940), American man who is the tallest person in history for whom there is irrefutable evidence
 Tim Wadlow (born 1974), American sailor

English-language surnames